Proverbs 18 is the eighteenth chapter of the Book of Proverbs in the Hebrew Bible or the Old Testament of the Christian Bible. The book is a compilation of several wisdom literature collections, with the heading in 1:1 may be intended to regard Solomon as the traditional author of the whole book, but the dates of the individual collections are difficult to determine, and the book probably obtained its final shape in the post-exilic period. This chapter is a part of the second collection of the book.

Text
The original text is written in Hebrew language. This chapter is divided into 24 verses.

Textual witnesses
Some early manuscripts containing the text of this chapter in Hebrew are of the Masoretic Text, which includes the Aleppo Codex (10th century), and Codex Leningradensis (1008).

There is also a translation into Koine Greek known as the Septuagint, made in the last few centuries BC. Extant ancient manuscripts of the Septuagint version include Codex Vaticanus (B; B; 4th century), Codex Sinaiticus (S; BHK: S; 4th century), and Codex Alexandrinus (A; A; 5th century).

Analysis
This chapter belongs to a section regarded as the second collection in the book of Proverbs (comprising Proverbs 10:1–22:16), also called "The First 'Solomonic' Collection" (the second one in Proverbs 25:1–29:27). The collection contains 375 sayings, each of which consists of two parallel phrases, except for Proverbs 19:7 which consists of three parts.

Verse 1
’’A man who isolates himself seeks his own desire;He rages against all wise judgment."Isolates himself": or "has separated himself” (cf. KJV, ASV, NASB), as the Hebrew word in Niphal participle functions substantively and has a reflexive nuance.
"Wise judgment": or "sound wisdom". 
A person of a misanthropic isolation described here is not merely anti-social, but becomes a problem for society since he will defy sound judgment.

Verse 5It is not good to favor the wicked,or to turn aside the righteous in judgment. 
"Not good": in form of a 'deliberate understatement to emphasize a worst-case scenario' (a figure of speech known as "tapeinosis"); can be rendered as “it is terrible!”
"To favor" translated from the idiom , seʾet pene, “lifting up the face of”, which means “to show partiality” in decisions (cf. This is probably related the custom of a ruler raising the face of a prostrate subject as a sign of favor (cf. Malachi 1:8).
While partiality in judgement is condemned in verse 5, verse 17 cautions against reaching
a premature verdict before a case carefully receives cross-examination, and if legal processes could not resolve the case, it is to
be submitted to divine arbitration (verse 18; cf. Proverbs 16:33).

Verse 6The words of a fool start fights;
do him a favor and gag him.

Verse 21
Death and life are in the power of the tongue:
and they that love it shall eat the fruit thereof.
"In the power of": or “in the hand of.”

See also

Related Bible parts: Deuteronomy 10, Proverbs 9, Proverbs 19, Proverbs 22, Proverbs 23, Malachi 1, Malachi 2

References

Sources

External links
 Jewish translations:
 Mishlei - Proverbs - Chapter 18 (Judaica Press) translation [with Rashi's commentary] at Chabad.org
 Christian translations:
 Online Bible at GospelHall.org (ESV, KJV, Darby, American Standard Version, Bible in Basic English)
 Book of Proverbs Chapter 18 King James Version
  Various versions

18